What's Left of Me may refer to:

 What's Left of Me (album), a 2006 album by Nick Lachey
 "What's Left of Me" (song), a 2006 single from the album
 What's Left of Me (novel), a 2012 novel by author Kat Zhang